Eduard Hartmann may refer to:

 Eduard Hartmann (1965−), Slovak ice hockey player and coach
 Karl Robert Eduard von Hartmann (1842−1906), German philosopher
 Eduard Hartmann (politician) (1904−1966), Austrian politician